Mayon is an active stratovolcano on the island of Luzon in the Philippines.

Mayon may also refer to:

 Mayon, Cornwall, England
 Mayon Kuipers (born 1988), Dutch long track speed skater, gold medalist at the 2018 European Speed Skating Championships – Women's team sprint
 Thirumal (Krishna) in South India
 The Indus Kohistani language of Pakistan

See also
 
 Mayong (disambiguation)